José Pedro Magalhães Valente (born 14 May 1994 in Castelões de Cepeda, Paredes), known as Zé Valente, is a Portuguese professional footballer who plays as an attacking midfielder for Indonesian club Persebaya Surabaya.

References

External links

1994 births
Living people
People from Paredes, Portugal
Sportspeople from Porto District
Portuguese footballers
Association football midfielders
Liga Portugal 2 players
Segunda Divisão players
U.S.C. Paredes players
F.C. Paços de Ferreira players
C.D. Aves players
F.C. Vizela players
G.D. Estoril Praia players
F.C. Penafiel players
Cypriot First Division players
Doxa Katokopias FC players
Liga 1 (Indonesia) players
PSS Sleman players
Persebaya Surabaya players
Portuguese expatriate footballers
Expatriate footballers in Cyprus
Expatriate footballers in Indonesia
Portuguese expatriate sportspeople in Cyprus
Portuguese expatriate sportspeople in Indonesia